The Order of National Scientists of the Philippines, abbreviated as ONS, is the highest award accorded to Filipino scientists by the Philippine government. Members of the order are known as National Scientists (Filipino: Pambansang Alagad ng Agham).

The award was created on December 16, 1976 by President Ferdinand Marcos through Presidential Decree Nos. 1003 and 1003-A, which also created the National Academy of Science and Technology. For the purposes of the law, a scientist is defined as “an individual who has earned a doctoral degree in any field of the sciences” and “has demonstrated and earned distinction in independent research or significant innovative achievement in the basic and applied sciences, including agricultural, engineering, and medical sciences, in mathematics and in the social sciences as manifested by published works in recognized scientific and technical journals.”  It was elevated to the status of order in 2003.

Nomination and selection

It is the task of the National Academy of Science and Technology which is composed of Filipino scientists to recommend not more than 10 scientists annually to the President of the Philippines for conferment of the rank of National Scientist.  It is the President of the Philippines who makes the ultimate selection, which is based on "distinguished individual or collaborative achievement in science and technology."

Benefits

Awardees are conferred the rank and title of National Scientist, with an accompanying medallion and citation. They are also given a financial gratuity with the amount determined by the National Academy. In addition, they are entitled to the same privileges enjoyed by National Artists of the Philippines, which include a monthly life pension, medical and hospitalization benefits, and a place of honour, in line with protocular precedence, at national state functions. They are likewise by law entitled upon death to a state funeral conducted by the National Academy and the Armed Forces of the Philippines, befitting their recognized status as heroes of the Philippines.

List of National Scientists

Since 1978, there have been 42 men and women have been designated as National Scientist in the roster where 14 of them are currently living. The most recent conferment was made to honor Emil Q. Javier. Honorees such as the Ramon Magsaysay Award-winning pediatrician Fé del Mundo, have garnered international recognition as well.

As of August 2019, the National Scientists of the Philippines are:

Notes:

References

Bibliography

External links
Government Briefer on the Order of National Scientist

Philippine science and technology awards
Filipino scientists
 
Orders, decorations, and medals of the Philippines
Establishments by Philippine presidential decree